"La fleur aux dents" is a song by Joe Dassin from his 1970 album Joe Dassin (La Fleur aux dents).

Released as a single, in France it was number one on the singles sales chart for seven consecutive weeks from January 28 to March 10, 1971.

Track listing 
7" single (CBS 5417)
 "La fleur aux dents" (2:18)
 "La Luzerne" (2:37)

Charts

References 

1970 songs
1971 singles
Joe Dassin songs
French songs
CBS Records singles
Number-one singles in France
Songs written by Joe Dassin
Songs written by Claude Lemesle
Song recordings produced by Jacques Plait